Melissourgoi is a former community in the Arta regional unit, Epirus, Greece. Since the 2011 local government reform it is part of the municipality Central Tzoumerka, of which it is a municipal unit. The municipal unit has an area of 35.510 km2, making it the smallest municipal unit in Central Tzoumerka. In 2011, it recorded a population of 419.

History
It was formerly an independent municipality, but in 2011, during the local government reform, it merged with Agnanta, Athamania, and Theodoriana to form the municipality of Central Tzoumerka.

Notable people 
Dimitris Tsovolas (1942-), politician
Ioannis Banias (1939-2012), politician

References

Populated places in Arta (regional unit)